The molecular formula C16H18N2O2 (molar mass: 270.33 g/mol, exact mass: 270.1368 u) may refer to:

 Ciproxifan
 Domoxin
 Ethonam
 Penniclavine

Molecular formulas